Couepia is a genus of flowering plants in the family Chrysobalanaceae described as a genus in 1775.

Couepia is native to Mesoamerica and South America.

Species

References

Chrysobalanaceae
Chrysobalanaceae genera